Frédéric Pierre (born 3 July 1969) is a French diver. He competed at the 1988 Summer Olympics, the 1992 Summer Olympics and the 2000 Summer Olympics.

References

1969 births
Living people
French male divers
Olympic divers of France
Divers at the 1988 Summer Olympics
Divers at the 1992 Summer Olympics
Divers at the 2000 Summer Olympics
Sportspeople from Saint-Maur-des-Fossés
20th-century French people